Flanigan is an Irish surname, alternatively spelt Flanagan, Flanigen and Flannigan. Notable people with the surname include:

People
 Allen Flanigan (born 2001), American basketball player
 Daniel M. Flanigan (1883-1946), American politician
 Joe Flanigan, American actor
 Peter Flanigan (1923–2013), American investment banker

Fictional characters
 Thomas Flanigan, character in the 1990 film King of New York

See also
 Flanigan, Nevada, United States, named after businessman Patrick L. Flanigan